Gennadi Leonidovich Vasilyev (31 August 1940 —  21 October 1999) was a Russian film director. He is best known for his film Finist, the brave Falcon  (1975).

References

External links
 

1940 births
1999 deaths
Russian film directors
Soviet film directors
Russian State Institute of Performing Arts alumni
Fantasy film directors
Soviet screenwriters
20th-century Russian screenwriters
Male screenwriters
20th-century Russian male writers
Communist Party of the Soviet Union members